Xiao Shuxuan (1894-1945) was a Chinese lieutenant general who served in the National Revolutionary Army before defecting to Wang Jingwei's Reorganized National Government of China. Xiao took part in the 1911 Xinhai Revolution and later fought in the Northern Expedition as a commander. In 1939-40, Xiao defected to Wang Jingwei's faction and joined his new pro-Japanese government. He held a number of prominent positions in Nanjing regime, including minister of Military Training and Chairman of the National Military Council. In 1943, when he was appointed head of the Central Military Academy and in March 1945, Army Minister.

He was killed in 1945 while resisting arrest.

Sources

Literature 
Xu, Youchun. Dictionary of the People of the Republic (民国人物大辞典 増訂版). Hebei People's Publishing House, 2007. .
Liu, Shou. Official Chronology of the Republic of China (民国職官年表). Zhonghua Book Company, 1995. .

References 

1894 births
1945 deaths
Chinese people of World War II
Generals from Fujian
Chinese collaborators with Imperial Japan
Kuomintang collaborators with Imperial Japan
Republic of China Army generals
Politicians from Fuzhou
Republic of China politicians from Fujian
People executed by China